Mark Anthony Duckens (born March 4, 1965) is a former American football defensive lineman in the National Football League. He played for the New York Giants (1989), the Detroit Lions (1990), and the Tampa Bay Buccaneers (1992). He played at Municipal University of Wichita, now known as Wichita State University and Arizona State University. He was a defensive tackle and a defensive end. Mark also briefly played for the Indianapolis Colts as well.

In 1993, Duckens was sentenced to a six-month pretrial diversion program for steroid possession along with former New York Giants teammate Eric Moore. They were described by federal agents as “pawns in international steroid ring.”|

References

1965 births
Living people
Players of American football from Wichita, Kansas
American football defensive tackles
American football defensive ends
Wichita State Shockers football players
Arizona State Sun Devils football players
New York Giants players
Detroit Lions players
Tampa Bay Buccaneers players